Jukka Hakala (born 7 November 1977) is a Finnish former footballer who played as defender.

After several years away from Kokkola, at the age of 32, Hakala signed one-year deal with KPV in April 2010.

References

1977 births
Living people
Finnish footballers
IK Start players
Sogndal Fotball players
Notodden FK players
Kokkolan Palloveikot players
Expatriate footballers in Norway
Finnish expatriate footballers
Finnish expatriate sportspeople in Denmark
Finnish expatriate sportspeople in Norway
Eliteserien players
TP-47 players
Association football defenders
People from Kokkola
Sportspeople from Central Ostrobothnia